The Palazzo Gualino is an office building in Turin, Italy built in 1928–30 for the entrepreneur Riccardo Gualino by the architects Gino Levi-Montalcini and Giuseppe Pagano.
It is an important example of early Italian rationalist architecture. 
The building was used for offices first by Gualino, then by Fiat and finally by the city of Turin, who sold it to a real estate developer in 2012.
A project to convert the office building into high-end apartments was begun in 2012, but was abandoned in 2015.

Construction

The Palazzo Gualino was built for the financier and art patron Riccardo Gualino, who saw the rationalist work of the architect Giuseppe Pagano (1896–1945) in an exhibition in 1928. 
He commissioned Pagano to build his company's headquarters in Turin on Corso Vittorio Emanuele.
The office building for the Gualino enterprises was built on land formerly occupied by the Villa Gallenga. 
Part of the earlier building remains as a service structure.
The design was based on formal simplification and careful attention to functional and technical needs.

Pagano and Gino Levi-Montalcini (1902–74) built the Palazzo Gualino in 1928–29, with a flat roof rather than the sloped tile roof typical of other buildings in the city.
In other ways the Rationalist design carefully combined modern and traditional features.
The building has a symmetrical facade with seven floors on the main front on the Corso Vittorio Emanuele, and five floors on the Via della Rocca.
The identical low-stacked floors and the unorthodox but functionally rational horizontal windows convey a sense of efficiency rather than power.

The design covered all aspects of the building's intended use, including the layout, decoration, furniture and fixtures.
The structure is of concrete, with light yellow and green plaster on the facades.
Gualino's former offices on the top floor open onto a veranda that looks over the Parco del Valentino.
Other innovations included the internal layout, the use of new industrial materials and the design of all the furnishings.

Magazines and newspapers hailed the building as the symbol of a new direction in architecture, an expression of progress and an example of new ways of organizing offices and management activities.
The Palazzo Gualino is considered to be a major statement of the emerging rationalist culture in Italy.
The Turin Society of Engineers and Architects recognized the building in 1984 as important both historically and for its artistic value as one of the first buildings of Italian Rationalism, completely preserved in its interior and finish.

Changes in ownership

Gualino's speculations with the French banker Albert Oustric ran into financial difficulties, and severe problems emerged with his bank during the financial crisis of 1929.
In 1930 Gualino was forced sell his share in SNIA Viscosa and many other investments to try to reduce his debt.
His collections of art were dispersed.
The Italian premier Benito Mussolini responded to Gualino's failure by saying he had caused "serious harm to the national economy".
Gualino was arrested in Turin in January 1931 and sentenced to five years confino.
This was a form of internal exile.

After Gualino was disgraced, the Palazzo Gualino was purchased by Fiat.
The Agnellis moved their personal offices to the building, which became one of the Fiat headquarters.
In 1988 it became the property of the City of Turin, and housed the city's tax offices.
In 2012 the city decided to sell the palace for €14.2 million to help resolve its financial difficulties.
It was closed and abandoned when it was purchased by Klg Torino, a subsidiary of Gesco Impressit of Rome. The new owner proposed to transform the building into high-end residential units using a design prepared by Baietto Battiato Bianco of Turin.

Renovation project

The plans to convert the Palazzo Gualino were presented in June 2012.
The project required major changes to the interior structure, including excavation for the new underground parking lots.
The plan was controversial.
The Superintendent of Architectural Heritage insisted on the exterior remaining unchanged apart from the glass "lantern" on the roof of the palace.
However, the carefully designed interior would be completely gutted.

The project began with much publicity on 21 June 2012.
The work was expected to last for 24 to 30 months.
Work on internal demolition continued for a year, then was halted.
In July 2015 it was reported that the builder was insolvent and the project had been abandoned, with two more years of work still required. The title was under dispute, but the city of Turin was trying to regain possession.

Notes

Sources

Commercial buildings completed in 1930
Palaces in Turin
Modernist architecture in Italy
1930 establishments in Italy